Carlo Grünn (born April 30, 1981) is a Finnish former ice hockey player who last played professionally in France for Étoile Noire de Strasbourg of the French Ligue Magnus.

Career statistics

References

External links

1981 births
Living people
Dornbirn Bulldogs players
Espoo Blues players
ETC Crimmitschau players
Étoile Noire de Strasbourg players
Finnish ice hockey forwards
HC Sierre players
HIFK (ice hockey) players
HPK players
JYP Jyväskylä players
Kiekko-Vantaa players
Mikkelin Jukurit players
Lahti Pelicans players
SaiPa players
Sportspeople from Espoo